Kafr Shams (also spelled Kfar Shams or Kafr ash-Shams) is a small city in southern Syria administratively belonging to the Al-Sanamayn District of the Daraa Governorate. In the 2004 census by the Central Bureau of Statistics Kafr Shams had a population of 12,435.

History
Kafr Shams experienced a construction boom during Byzantine Empire rule, particularly during the reign of Justinian I, mostly focused on large rural housing. The town was dominated by the Ghassanids, an Arab Christian vassal kingdom of the Byzantines. The Ghassanids built a major Monophysite monastery there around 570 CE.

Ottoman era
In 1838, Kefr Shems was noted as a village in the el-Jeidur district.

In 1897 German archaeologist Gottlieb Schumacher reported Kafr Shams had a population of 600 Muslims living in 120 to 130 huts. Ancient ruins and subterranean arches were noted in the village and the two Ghassanid monasteries were still largely intact.

Modern era
During the 1973 Yom Kippur War Kafr Shams was the scene of clashes between the Israeli Army and the joint forces of the Jordanian, Iraqi and Syrian armies.

Many of the residents of Kafr Shams have participated in protests against the Syrian government as part of the 2011-2012 Syrian uprising.

See also
Hauran

References

Bibliography

External links
Map of town, Google Maps
 Sanameine-map, 19L

Populated places in Al-Sanamayn District